Michael Phillips may refer to:

Michael Phillips (Australian politician) (1851–1905), New South Wales politician
Michael Phillips (consultant) (born 1938), created MasterCard in 1966
Michael Phillips (historian) (born 1960) 
Michael Phillips (producer) (born 1943), American film producer
Michael Phillips (psychiatrist), Canadian psychiatrist
Michael Phillips (figure skater) (died 2016), British figure skater and ice dancer
Michael Phillips (critic) (born 1961), American film critic
Michael Phillips (footballer) (born 1983), English footballer
Michael Phillips (barista)

See also
Mike Phillips (disambiguation)
Mikael Phillips, Jamaican politician